Collier House may refer to the following in the United States
(by state)
Collier-Overby House, Tuscaloosa, listed on the NRHP in Alabama
Collier House (Pine Bluff, Arkansas), formerly NRHP-listed in Arkansas
Kuns-Collier House, McPherson, listed on the NRHP in Kansas
Brandon-Bell-Collier House, Fulton, listed on the NRHP in Missouri
Collier-Crichlow House, Murfreesboro, listed on the NRHP in Tennessee
Collier House (University of Oregon), (1886) existing building and former faculty club and restaurant